The 2020–21 Ardal NW season (also known as the 2020–21 Lock Stock Ardal NW season for sponsorship reasons) was to be the first season of the new third-tier northern region football in Welsh football pyramid, part of the Ardal Leagues.  Teams were to play each other twice on a home and away basis.

Due to the COVID-19 pandemic in Wales, the Football Association of Wales cancelled the 2020–21 seasons of the Ardal Leagues and below.

Teams
Normally, the league is made up of 16 teams competing for one automatic promotion place to Cymru North, whilst the second place team goes into a play-off with the second place team of Ardal NE.  Three teams aree relegated to tier 4.

Team changes

To Ardal NW
From Welsh Alliance League Division 1
 Denbigh Town
 Llandudno Albion
 Llanrwst United
 Nantlle Vale
 St Asaph City
 Blaenau Amateurs

Promoted from Welsh Alliance League Division 2
 Y Felinheli

From Welsh National League Premier Division
 Mold Alexandra
 Brymbo
 Llanuwchllyn
 Llay Welfare
 Saltney Town
 Rhydymwyn
 Brickfield Rangers
 Rhostyllen

Relegated from Cymru North
 Porthmadog

Stadia and locations

Source: Ardal NW Ground Information

Season overview
On 28 July 2020, the Football Association of Wales announced that this league would be named Ardal NW and would be sponsored by Lock Stock Self Storage.  Ardal NE & Ardal NW divisions will make up the Ardal Northern region of Tier 3 in the men's Welsh domestic game.

Since anti-COVID-19 restrictions were put in place by FAW., clubs could have trained in groups of 15 and contact training was allowed at all-levels of football.  However, competitive and exhibition matches were still not allowed to take place.

League table

Results

References

External links
Football Association of Wales
Ardal Northern Leagues
Ardal Northern Twitter Page
Tier 3 Rules & Regulations

2020–21 in Welsh football
Ardal Leagues
Wales